Pioneer is an unincorporated community in Campbell County, Tennessee, United States. Its ZIP code is 37847.  It is situated in the upper Cove Creek Valley at the intersection of Tennessee State Route 297 and Tennessee State Route 63.

Notes

Unincorporated communities in Campbell County, Tennessee
Unincorporated communities in Tennessee